KVSV may refer to:

 KVSV (AM), a radio station (1190 AM) licensed to Beloit, Kansas, United States
 KVSV-FM, a radio station (105.5 FM) licensed to Beloit, Kansas, United States